United is a Japanese thrash metal band formed in 1981. They took their name from the song of the same name, off of Judas Priest's British Steel.

History 
Originally a Judas Priest and Black Sabbath cover band, they began to write their own material in 1983 when bassist Yokoyama joined. United have played numerous times in North America and have had a couple of their albums released there as well. They have played with Anthrax, Slayer, Testament and Machine Head on their Japanese tours, and in 2010 was Paul Di'Anno's live band for his. In 2009, the group recruited Kuwaiti frontman Kenshin. They released their ninth album Tear of Illusions on April 20, 2011. At the end of 2012, the band announced that Kenshin had left the group. Masatoshi Yuasa, who was their frontman from 2000 to 2004, returned as the vocalist of United in April 2013. The band's longest serving member, bassist and manager Akihiro Yokoyama, died on May 13, 2014. A concert titled Yoko Fest The Final was held in his honor on September 12, 2014, that featured nearly every member of United, past and present, and other diverse acts such as Head Phones President, Passpo, Garlic Boys, Flow, and Outrage.

Members 
Current members
 Yoshifumi "Hally" Yoshida – guitar (1988–present)
 Singo Otani – guitar (1990–present)
 Akira Tominaga – drums (2004–present)
 Masatoshi Yuasa – vocals (2000–2004, 2013–present)
 George Enda – bass (2014–present)

Former members
 Oz – bass (1981–1983)
 Yasu Tsukahara – drums (1981–1983)
 Jouichi "Joe" Hirokawa – drums (1985)
 Kouichi "Nao" – vocals (1981–1986; died 2017)
 Takeshi "Mantas" Nakazato – guitar (1981–1987)
 Tetsuo "Tetsu" Takizawa – drums (1983–1985, 1985–1988)
 Masaki "Marchan" Hara – guitar (1981–1988)
 Iwao Furusawa – guitar (1987–1990)
 Yoshiaki Furui – vocals (1986–1995)
 Yuichi Uchino – drums (1988–1998)
 Shinichi Inazu – vocals (1996–2000)
 Yusuke Nakamura – drums (1999–2003)
 Nob – vocals (2005–2008)
 Faisal "Kenshin" Al-Salem – vocals (2009–2012)
 Akihiro Yokoyama – bass (1983–2014; also manager; died 2014)

Timeline

Discography

Studio albums

EPs 
 Destroy Metal (February 1985, picture disc vinyl in February 1987)
 Beast Dominate (December 1986, picture disc vinyl in April 1987)
 Beast Dominates '92 (1992)
 Burst (May 2, 1997)

Other albums 
 Best Rare Tracks from Underground (March 24, 1995, compilation album)
 Scars of the Wasted Years (April 4, 2012, self-cover album)

Demo 
 "Demo '89" (January 1990)

V/A Compilations 
 Devil Must Be Driven Out with Devil (1986, "Positive War" & "Bite Yourself")
 Emergency Express – Metal Warning 2 (1989, "Suck Your Bone")
 Flower Travellin' Band Tribute (September 20, 2000, "Make Up")
 Tribute to Bad Brains (November 29, 2000, "Riot Squad – How Low Can a Punk Get?")
 Beast Feast Admission (August 2, 2001, "Cross Over the Line")
 Power Germanys (April 27, 2002)
 Enter the Beast Feast (April 27, 2004, "Sonic Sublime")
 Beast Feast Admission 2K2 (December 17, 2002, "Hate Yourself, Hate Your Own Kind")
 Tribute to Garlic Boys (August 18, 2006, "Skate & Mosh")
 44Magnum Tribute Album (April 2, 2008, "It's Too Bad")

DVD 
 Official Bootleg (September 27, 2008)

References

External links 
 
 Official blog
 Interview with Kenshin
 Hally ESP guitar gallery
 Singo ESP guitar gallery
 Yoko ESP guitar gallery

Japanese thrash metal musical groups
Japanese heavy metal musical groups
Musical groups from Tokyo
Musical groups established in 1981
Musical quartets